Thomas William Wilkinson (18 October 1875 – 30 April 1950) was a British sculptor.

Wilkinson studied at Bradford School of Art and Ipswich School of Art. The majority of his work was of portrait heads. His work was part of the sculpture event in the art competition at the 1948 Summer Olympics. He was an associate of the Royal Society of British Sculptors and a member of Ipswich Art Club between 1907 and 1949

References

1875 births
1950 deaths
20th-century British sculptors
20th-century British male artists
British male sculptors
Olympic competitors in art competitions
Artists from Bradford
Artists from Ipswich